Nantasket Junction is an MBTA Commuter Rail station in Hingham, Massachusetts. It serves the Greenbush Line. It is located off Chief Justice Cushing Highway east of downtown Hingham. It consists of a single side platform serving the line's one track. The station is fully accessible.

History
The New Haven Railroad abandoned its remaining Old Colony Division lines on June 30, 1959, after the completion of the Southeast Expressway. Nantasket Junction station (also known as Old Colony House) was located at Summer Street at the wye with the Nantasket Beach Railroad.

The MBTA reopened the Greenbush Line on October 31, 2007, with Nantasket Junction station located at the former station site. The parking lot is located on the land formerly inside the wye.

Solar panels were installed over the parking lot in 2018 – one of the first three of a planned 37 such installations at MBTA parking lots – though activation was delayed by a dispute between the MBTA and the utility over liability.

References

External links

MBTA - Nantasket Junction

Stations along Old Colony Railroad lines
Railway stations in the United States opened in 2007
Buildings and structures in Hingham, Massachusetts
MBTA Commuter Rail stations in Plymouth County, Massachusetts
2007 establishments in Massachusetts